This is a list of current and former programmes broadcast on BBC Radio 4.

When it came into existence – on 30 September 1967 – Radio 4 inherited a great many continuing programme series which had been initiated prior to that date by its predecessor, the BBC Home Service (1939–1967), and in some cases even by stations which had preceded the Home Service. Such inherited programmes are included in the list.

The years indicated in brackets after programme titles refer to the dates, where known, of each programme's first, subsequent, and final broadcasts – and, in cases where Radio 4 programmes began their run on stations other than the Home Service, the names of those originating stations are also shown.

Note that many of Radio 4's past comedy and drama productions have been, and continue to be repeatedly rerun on Radio 4, as well as on the digital radio channel BBC Radio 4 Extra (previously BBC Radio 7).

News and current affairs
The Africans (2007)
Americana (2009–11)
Analysis (1970–)
Any Answers? (1955–)
Any Questions? (1948–)
Asian Diasporas (2007–)
The Bottom Line (2006–)
Broadcasting House (1998–)
 Checkpoint (1973–85) (became Face The Facts)
The Commission
The Copysnatchers
Crossing Continents (2002–)
 Does He Take Sugar? (1977–98)
Face the Facts (1984–)
Farming Today (1964-)
Farming Today This Week
File on 4 (1975–)
From Our Own Correspondent (1955–)
In Business (1975–)
In Search of the British Work Ethic (2010)
In Touch (1961–)
Inside Money
iPM (2007–)
Law in Action
Letter from America (1946–2004)
Midnight News
Money Box (1977–)
More or Less
Nice Work (2002–05)
The Pariah Profession
PM (1970–)
A Point of View (2007–)
The Politics of Hunger
Profile
Seven Days
Six O'clock News
Sport on Four (1977–98)
Straw Poll
Straw Poll Talk Back
Taking Issue
Taking a Stand
Talking Politics
Today (1957–)
Today in Parliament (1945–)
United Nations or Not?
Week in Westminster
The Westminster Hour
With Us or Against Us
The World at One (1965–)
The World This Weekend
The World Tonight (1970–)
Yesterday in Parliament (1947 Light Programme; 1957–)

Drama
A Touch of Mistletoe, 1930s-set sentimental drama 
The Afternoon Play
The Archers (1950–), farming soap opera
Cashcows (2005)
The Classic Serial
Dr Finlay's Casebook
The Friday Play
Saturday Night Theatre (1943–96)
St. Berks
Talk to Sleep, 4-part comedy-drama by John Dryden
Woman's Hour Drama
Neverwhere
Tumanbay
Tracks
The Children of the Stones
The Stone Tape
The Lovecraft Investigations

Arts
The Afternoon Reading
Back Row
Book at Bedtime (1949–57 Light Programme; 1962–)
Book of the Week
Bookclub
The Film Programme
Front Row
A Good Read
Kaleidoscope (1973–98)
Loose Ends (1985–)
The Heard
Open Book
Poetry Please
Radio Lives, (1990–96) profiles of radio personalities
Radio Roots, profiles of radio personalities
The Saturday Play
Saturday Review
Soul Music
White Nights
With Great Pleasure

Quizzes
Counterpoint (1986–)
Brain of Britain
Masterteam, general knowledge quiz (2001–2006)
Prompt!, theatre quiz (1986-1988)
Round Britain Quiz
The 3rd Degree
Wildbrain, natural history quiz (1997–2002)
X Marks the Spot (1998–2006)

Comedy

Panel games
Armando Iannucci's Charm Offensive (2005–08), satirical quiz
Does the Team Think? (1957–67 Light Programme; 1968, 1970–73 Radio 2; 1970–71, 1974–76 Radio 4; 2007–09 Radio 2), parody of Any Questions?
Foul Play, writers are asked to solve a murder mystery written by host Simon Brett 
Heresy (2003–), the presenter and a panel of guests commit "heresy" by challenging people's most deeply held opinions on a subject
I Guess That's Why They Call It The News (2009), satirical news-based quiz
I'm Sorry I Haven't a Clue (1972–), nonsensical word and musical games played by comedians
Inspiration, quiz about inventions presented by Chris Stuart 
It's Your Round (2011), game in which each contestant suggests a game to play for one round
Just a Minute (1967–), parlour game involving speaking without hesitation, deviation, or repetition
King Stupid, earlier version of panel game The 99p Challenge
Many a Slip (1964–79), contestants must spot mistakes in texts and music
The Motion Show
My Music (1967–93), musical games
My Word! (1956–90), word games played by comedy writers and journalists
The News Quiz (1977–), satirical quiz on week's news
The 99p Challenge (1998–2004), silly games and tasks
The Personality Test (2006–07), a guest host asks questions about his or herself
Petticoat Line (1965–1976), all female discussion
Puzzle Panel (1998–2005), puzzles
Quote... Unquote (1976–), quiz about quotations
So Wrong It's Right (2010–12), Charlie Brooker asks his guests to invent or nominate really awful things
The Unbelievable Truth (2007–), game in which contestants deliver a mostly untrue speech and panelists must identify true statements
We've Been Here Before, historically-oriented panel show with Clive Anderson
Whispers (2003–05), quiz about celebrity rumours and gossip
Who Goes There, biographical quiz
Whose Line is it Anyway? (1988), improvisational comedy game
The Write Stuff (1998–2014), questions about literature and writing parodies of a specific author

Sitcoms
Absolute Power (2000–4), public relations company satire
Acropolis Now (2000–2), the fictional adventures of historical figures in ancient Greece
After Henry (1985–89), about three generations of women living together following a bereavement
Alison and Maud (2002–04), sitcom about sisters running a bed and breakfast
All Gas and Gaiters (1966–71), church farce starring Derek Nimmo
All the Young Dudes (2001–02), comedy-drama written by and starring Jim Sweeney
As Time Goes By (1997–99), radio adaptation of BBC TV sitcom (1992–2005) about a rekindled romance
At Home with the Snails (2001–02), somewhat surreal family sitcom about the dysfunctional family of a man who is obsessed with snails.
The Attractive Young Rabbi (1999–2002), gentle comedy about the clash of attitudes between a young female Reform Rabbi and an older, more traditional male Orthodox Rabbi
Ballylenon (1994-9 and 2009–10), sitcom set in a 1950s County Donegal village.
Beta Female
The Big Business Lark (1969), sitcom set in the boardroom of a national plastics business.
The Big Town All Stars (1998–2001), sitcom about an up-and-coming a cappella group.
The Bigger Issues (2002–03), set in world of fringe theatre
Bleak Expectations
Brian Gulliver's Travels (2011–12), a satirical modern pastiche of Gulliver's Travels
The Brothers (2004–07), sitcom about two brothers who give up their careers to design websites.
Brothers in Law (1970–2), legal comedy with Richard Briers, based on the TV series
The Cabaret of Dr Caligari, macabre comedy
Cabin Pressure, comedy about a very small airline with one plane
The Castle
Chambers, legal sitcom, later moving to TV
Clare in the Community, about a social worker
Count Arthur Strong, adventures of elderly comedian prone to malapropism
Dad's Army (1973–75), about the Home Guard during World War II
Deep Trouble, nuclear submarine comedy
Delve Special, investigative journalism parody
The Department, satirical comedy about a mysterious organisation
Do Nothing till You Hear from Me, about a trumpet player
Double Income, No Kids Yet, about a childless couple surrounded by families
Double Science, about school science teachers
Ed Reardon's Week, a struggling and aging writer
Elephants to Catch Eels, historical sitcom about Cornish smugglers
ElvenQuest, fantasy parody
The Embassy Lark, diplomatic comedy
Fags, Mags and Bags (2007–), set in a newsagent/general store
The Fall Of The Mausoleum Club (1988), macabre comedy starring Jim Broadbent
Fallen Arches (1988–89)
Four Joneses and a Jenkins, family comedy-drama set in rural Wales
Flatshare by Beth O'Leary
Flying the Flag (1987–92), Cold War diplomatic satire
Flywheel, Shyster and Flywheel (on Radio 4 1990–2, originally made for NBC Blue Network), law firm satire featuring the Marx Brothers
Giles Wemmbley Hogg Goes Off, adventures of a posh idiot traveling the world
Hinge and Bracket, comedy from female impersonators:
At Home with Hinge and Bracket (1990) 
The Enchanting World of Hinge and Bracket  (1977–1979)
The Random Jottings of Hinge and Bracket (1982–1989)
The Hitchhiker's Guide to the Galaxy (1978, 1980, 2004–5), science fiction comedy by Douglas Adams
Hordes of the Things, parody of The Lord of the Rings
The House of the Spirit Levels, parody of business and northern family sagas
Hut 33 (2007–09), set among code-breakers at Bletchley Park
I Think I've Got a Problem, musical comedy with Bob Monkhouse and Suggs
In the..., black comedies based on Mark Tavener's writing
In the Red
In the Balance
In the Chair
In the End
King Street Junior, junior school
Knowing Me, Knowing You (1992–93), parody with Steve Coogan's presenter character
Ladies of Letters, sitcom with Patricia Routledge and Prunella Scales playing elderly correspondents
Legal, Decent, Honest and Truthful, advertising satire starring Martin Jarvis
Lenin of the Rovers
Linda Smith's A Brief History of Timewasting
The Little Big Woman Show, sitcom about a wannabe singer working as a temp
Little Blighty on the Down (1988–92), satirical village comedy
A Little Night Exposure (1978)
Living with the Enemy, former left-wing comedian and right-wing politician forced into house-share
The Long Dark Tea-Time of the Soul, Douglas Adams adaptation
Man of Soup, sitcom set in post-Soviet eastern Europe 
The Masterson Inheritance, improvised historical comedy parodying costume drama
McKay the New (1989–91), sitcom
The Men from the Ministry (1962–77), civil service
Millport. Set in main town of Great Cumbrae, island in River Clyde
Milton Jones:
Another Case of Milton Jones
The House of Milton Jones
The Very World of Milton Jones
Mr and Mrs Smith, marriage guidance sitcom by British comedian Will Smith
Mr Blue Sky show about an optimistic family man by Andrew Collins
More Mr Mulliner, from PG Wodehouse's stories
The Motorway Men (1972), sitcom about labourers building motorways
Nebulous, post-apocalyptic
The Next Programme Follows Almost Immediately, 1970s show set in a comedy factory starring David Jason
The Nick Revell Show, absurdist sitcom about a writer and his talking geraniums
Night Class, Johnny Vegas sitcom about a pottery teacher 
No Commitments, about three sisters
Not Today, Thank You
Old Dog and the Partridge, pub sitcom
Old Harry's Game, Andy Hamilton comedy about Satan
Our Brave Boys, set in British Ministry of Defence
Parsley Sidings, set in a quiet railway station
Party, about young people founding a new political party
The Party Line, topical political sitcom by Steve Punt and Hugh Dennis
The Quanderhorn Xperimentations (2018), a science fiction spoof by Rob Grant and Andrew Marshall
The Rapid Eye Movement, sitcom about a writer with tiny actors living in his head
Reluctant Persuaders, London's worst advertising agency. Written by Edward Rowett. Stars Nigel Havers, Josie Lawrence, Mathew Baynton, Rasmus Hardiker, Olivia Nixon and Kieran Hodgson
Rent, house share comedy
Revolting People, set US in run-up to American Revolutionary War
Rigor Mortis, in hospital pathology department
Ring Around the Bath, domestic sitcom
Robin and Wendy's Wet Weekends
Romantic Friction, sitcom about a romance writer
Ronan the Amphibian (2003), about a financial adviser turned into an amphibian by aliens
Rudy's Rare Records, set in a record store starring Lenny Henry
Scenes from Provincial Life, adaptation of William Cooper's novel
Sean Lock:
Sean Lock, 15 Storeys High, sitcom
Sean Lock's 15 Minutes Of Misery, sitcom
Seymour the Fractal Cat, science fiction
Share and Share Alike, sitcom about a share-dealing club
The Six Mothers-in-law of HenryVIII (2003), an unreliable history of Tudor times created and written by Barry Grossman
The Shuttleworths, comedy about domestic life of character John Shuttleworth
Smelling of Roses, Prunella Scales as an event manager
Snap, divorce sitcom by Paul Mendelson
The Sofa of Time, fantasy comedy
Something or Other, dark comedy by Alex Bartlette and Grant Cathro
Stanley Baxter and Friends, series of 4 sitcoms
Stockport, so Good they Named it Once, comedy drama
Think the Unthinkable (2001–05), about management consultants
Three Men Went to Mow (2002–03), gardening sitcom
Tim Merryman's Days of Clover (2003), business sitcom
Time For Mrs Milliner, Jane Asher hat-making sitcom 
To the Manor Born
Toad Squad, episode of Hopes and Desires re-broadcast as a one-off
Truly, Madly, Bletchley, sitcom about public access radio
Two Doors Down, sitcom set in suburban Glasgow
Unnatural Acts, sitcom about a married couple
Up the Garden Path, family comedy from Sue Limb's novel
Tomorrow, Today!, science fiction parody
Vongole, campus comedy with Bill Nighy
Weak at the Top, business and management satire
Whatever Happened to the Likely Lads? (1975), adaptation of TV series about two working-class men
Creighton Wheeler, a Zelig-like figure in two series:
Wheeler's Fortune
Wheeler's Wonder
A Whole 'Nother Story, sitcom
Wild Things, garden centre sitcom
Winston in Love, Peter Tinniswood sitcom
The Wordsmiths at Gorsemere, romantic poetry spoof by Sue Limb from her book 
World of Pub, pub sitcom
Yes Minister, adaptation of satire about politician and civil service
You'll Have Had Your Tea (2002–07), silly comedy using Barry Cryer and Graeme Garden's long-running characters

Sketch shows
And Now in Colour, sketch show 
Armstrong and Miller
The Atkinson People, spoof profiles
Auntie's Secret Box (1996)
Beachcomber, by the Way, surreal comedy
Bearded Ladies
The Big Booth, sketch show with Boothby Graffoe and others
Bigipedia, high-concept sketch show set within a fictional wikipedia-like website
The Burkiss Way
The Cheese Shop
Chewin' the Fat
The Children's Hour, spoof children's show reports
Cliché (1981)
Concrete Cow (2002–03)
The Consultants (2003–05)
The Curried Goat Show, sketch show
Dan and Nick: The Wildebeest Years
Dead Ringers
Dial M for Pizza
Don't Start
Down the Line
Five Squeezy Pieces, largely female sketch show 
Forty Nights in the Wildebeest sketch show, follow up to Dan and Nick: The Wildebeest Years
Goodness Gracious Me
The Grumbleweeds Radio Show (1979–88 Radio 2; ? –91)
The Harpoon
Harry Hill's Fruit Corner
Hearing with Hegley, sketch show with poet John Hegley
The Hudson and Pepperdine Show
The In Crowd, sketch show from Manchester including Robin Ince
In One Ear, sketch show
Injury Time (1980–82), Oxbridge performers in revue sketches
The Jason Explanation, sketch show with David Jason 
John Finnemore's Souvenir Programme (2011 to present)
Laura Solon: Talking and Not Talking
The League Against Tedium, Simon Munnery
On the Town With the League of Gentlemen (1997)
Lines From My Grandfather's Forehead (1971–72)
Lionel Nimrod's Inexplicable World, parodic show exploring a different topic each week
Listen Against, parodying British radio
Listen to Les, Les Dawson
Little Britain
A Look Back at the Nineties, satirical sketches
Marriott's Monologues, monologues by comic writer Marriott Edgar
The Mel and Sue Thing
The Michael Bentine Show
The Boosh
The Miles and Millner Show, music and sketches
The Milligan Papers
Milligna (or Your Favourite Spike), Spike Milligan sketch show
The Million Pound Radio Show
The Museum of Everything
Naked Radio
The Now Show (1998–)
The Omar Khayyam Show, Spike Milligan comedy
On the Hour (1991–92)
The Pin, winner of 'Best Comedy' at 2016 BBC Radio Awards
Radio Active (1980–7)
Radio9
The Reduced Shakespeare Radio Show, Shakespeare parody
Round The Horne
Saturday Night Fry (1988)
Six Geese a Laying, Zoe Lyons
The Six Mothers in Law of Henry VIII, parodic history documentary
The Skewer
The Skivers, sketches
The Small World of Dominic Holland, standup and sketches
Son of Cliché (1983–84)
Struck Off and Die, medical themed sketches and vox pops
The Sunday Format
A Swift Laugh, Griff Rhys Jones selects great comedy moments
That Mitchell and Webb Sound
This Is Craig Brown, satirical sketches
Two Thousand Years of Radio, comedy with Claire Downes and Stuart Lane
Week Ending (1970–98)

Individual comedy plays
The 15 Minute Musical (2004–)
Kenneth William's Playhouse (1975)
Trapped, series of comedy dramas about trapped people, by Mark and Daniel Maier

Stand-up, cabaret, and variety
Boothby Graffoe In No Particular Order
The Cabaret Upstairs, introduced by Clive Anderson
Four at the Store, stand-up
Four in a Field, stand-up from Glastonbury Festival and Latitude Festival
The Frankie Howerd (Variety) Show
Henry Normal's Encyclopedia Poetica, spoof guide to poetry with readings from comic poets
Ken Dodd's Palace of Laughter, from his touring show
The Ken Dodd Show
King Cutler, Phyllis King and Ivor Cutler performing songs, poems, and stories
Mark Steel's in Town, performed in venues around (and outside) the UK
Ross Noble Goes Global (2002–04)
Ross Noble On...
A Set and a Song, comedy and music
Sounding Off with McGough, performances by poet Roger McGough
Stand Up 2
Stand Up America
Stand Up Great Britain
Stand Ups and Strumpets

Talks
Chris Addison:
The Ape That Got Lucky
Chris Addison's Civilisation (2006)
Fanshawe Gets to the Bottom of
Frank Muir Goes Into, comedian takes a humorous look at different topics 
Guy Browning's Small Talk, humorous life coaching advice
Rainer Hersch:
All Classical Music Explained
Rainer Hersch's 20th Century Retrospective
It's a Fair Cop
Jeremy Hardy Speaks to the Nation
Life, Death and Sex with Mike and Sue
Mark Steel:
The Mark Steel Lectures (1999–2002)
The Mark Steel Revolution (1998)
The Mark Steel Solution (1992 Radio 5; 1994–96)
Mark Watson Makes the World Substantially Better (2007)
Mitch Benn's Crimes Against Music
People Like Us (1995–97)
The Problem with Adam Bloom with Adam Bloom
Round Ireland with a Fridge, by Tony Hawks, later a film
Where Did It All Go Wrong?, monologues from Simon Munnery
Will Smith Presents the Tao of Bergerac

Documentaries
Absent Friends, documentary about off-screen comedy characters by Alan Stafford
The Borscht Belt, documentary by David Prest
Cartoons, Lampoons, and Buffoons (1998)
Comedy Album Heroes, Greg Proops presents show about classic comedy albums 
Double Trouble, documentary about famous comedy double acts
Fred Housego's Unknowns, documentary about lesser-known comedians
How Tickled Am I, profiles of comedians and comic actors by Mark Radcliffe
Palace of Laughter (2002–03), Geoffrey Wheeler visits old music halls
Radio Anarchists, profile of American 1960s pranksters Coyle and Sharpe
Radio Fun, series on comics presented by Bob Monkhouse
Should We Be Laughing?, documentary about disability in comedy
Six Characters in Search of an Answer, profiling well-known comedy characters
There'll Never be Another, documentary on comedy with Graeme Garden
Turns of the Century, comedy documentary

Science, technology and medicine
All in the Mind (2003–)
Another Five Numbers
Brief History of the End of Everything
Britain's X-Files
Case Notes
A Cell for All Seasons
Changing Places
Check Up
Climate Wars
The Columbia Astronauts
Connect
Costing the Earth
Dial a Scientist — (~1976) (see Brian J. Ford (scientist))
Emotional Rollercoaster
Five Numbers
Frontiers
The Good, the Bad and the Ugly
Home Planet
The Infinite Monkey Cage
The Life Scientific
Land Lines
Leading Edge
Life as an Adult
Life as a Teenager
Life in Middle Age
Lifeblood
Living with Pain
Living World
Material World
Medicine Now
Mind Changers
The Mozart Effect
Nature
Nature's Magic
The New X-Files
One Man's Medicine
Patient Progress: Strokes
Rainforests of the Deep
Red Planet
Reith Lectures
Science Now (1974–1975+ (?)) (see Brian J. Ford)
Scientists in a Shoebox
Seeds of Trouble
Small Dog on Mars
Stars in Their Eyes
Swan Migration
Tales of Cats and Comets
Think About It
Tweet of the Day (2013-)
A Twist to Life
Unearthing Mysteries
Walk Out to Winter
What Remains to Be Discovered?
Whatever you think
Where are you taking us?
Wild Europe
Wild Underground
World on the Move
Wrestling with Words

Religion and ethics
Bells on Sunday
Beyond Belief
Bigots and Believers
The Choice
Church Going
The Daily Service (1925 Daventry 5XX; 1929 National Programme; 1939–)
Devout Sceptics
Four Noble Truths
A Higher Place (2002)
In the Footsteps of Moses
Lent Talks
The Long Search (1977)
Missionaries
The Moral Maze (1990–)
Prayer for the Day
The Real Patron Saints
Something Understood (1995–)
Sounding the Divine
Sunday
Sunday Worship
Ten to Eight (1965–70)
Thought for the Day (1970–)
Words from the Cross

History
A History of the World in 100 Objects (2010–)
The Norman Way (2004)
Apprentice
Back to Beeching
The Child Migrants
City of the Sharp Nosed Fish
Creme de la Crime, documentary about famous crimes with Steve Punt and Hugh Dennis
The Dark Origins of Britain
The Decade of Self-doubt
Document
Falkland Families
For What It's Worth
Great Lives
Heroes and Villains
A History of Human Folly
In Our Time (1998–)
Lend Me Your Ears
The Long View
Making History
Mapping the Town
Memory Like Shells Bursting
Reconciling Histories
The Reunion
The Roman Way
The Routes of English
The Secret Museum
Soldier, Sailor
Spies R US: the history of the CIA
The Telemark Heroes
This Sceptred Isle (1995–)
The Three Voyages of Captain Cook
Tiger Tales
Voices of the Powerless
What If..?
Why Did We Do That?

Factual
The Archive Hour
Between Ourselves
Breakaway (1979–98)
Cartoon Clichés
Chetham's School of Music
Community Caring
Cutting a Dash
A Dance through Time
Darcus and Dickens
Deep Blue
Desert Island Discs (1942–), long-running show in which a guest picks their favourite records
A Different World
Down Your Way
Excess Baggage
Feedback: Radio series
File on 4, documentary reports
The Food Programme
Four Corners
Four Thought
Herbs: Pure and Simple
Home This Afternoon (1964–70)
The House I Grew Up In
Gardeners' Question Time (1947–), long-running horticultural advice from a panel of experts
Go 4 It
Going Places
Great Lives
Home Truths (1998–2006)
In Living Memory
In Our Time (2002–)
In Touch
An Indian in Bloomsbury
Is It On?
It's My Story: Physician, Heal Thyself
Last Word
The Learning Curve
Let's Pretend
The Message
Nothing to Do But Drink
On the Ropes
On Your Farm
Open Country
Painted Fabrics
Poisoned Angel: the Story of Alma Rosé
Public Records, Private Lives
Questions, Questions
Ramblings
Reel Histories
Subterranean Stories
Thinking Allowed
This Sceptred Isle (1995–1996, 1999, 2001, 2005–2006)
Traveller's Tree
Travels with my Anti-Semitism (1999), David Cohen
Veg Talk
Weekend Woman's Hour
Winnie the Pooh Lost and Found
Woman's Hour (1946 Light Programme; 1973–), magazine program aimed at women
Word of Mouth
A World in Your Ear
You and Yours (1970–)

Conversations
Chain Reaction, light-hearted interviews with each guest becoming the following week's host
Genius, members of the public present ideas to make the world better
In Conversation With, interviews, mainly with comedians
Loose Ends (1986–)
Midweek
Never the Same Again (1986–95)
Off The Page
Room 101, in which celebrities pick their most-hated things
Start the Week
Stop The Week (1974–1992) 
That Reminds Me, reminiscences from celebrities
Where Are You Taking Us? (1973?)-1974? (also see Brian J. Ford (presenter))

Miscellaneous
After Eden
After Happy Ever
Listen with Mother (1950 Light Programme; 1973–82)
Pick of the Week
Radio 4 Appeal
UK Theme (1973–2006)
Saturday Live
Shipping Forecast (1925 Daventry 5XX; 1929–39 National Programme; 1945 Light Programme; 1967 Radio 2; 1978–)
Test Match Special (1956 Third Programme; 1967 Radio 3; 1994–)
Weather Forecast (1922 London 2LO; 1925 Daventry 5XX; 1929–39 National Programme; 1945–)

References

External links
BBC Radio 4 site – A-Z of all Radio 4 programmes

Radio 4 programmes
BBC Radio 4 programmes